The 1938 Montana Grizzlies football team represented the University of Montana in the 1938 college football season as a member of the Pacific Coast Conference (PCC). Led by fourth-year head coach Doug Fessenden, they played their home games on campus in Missoula at Dornblaser Field. The Grizzlies finished the season with an overall record of 5–3–1, and were 0–1 in PCC play.

Late October marked the 25th game with conference rival Idaho and the first for the Little Brown Stein trophy. With the 19–6 win in Missoula on homecoming, Idaho extended its series advantage over the Grizzlies to 19–5–1.

Schedule

The Governors Cup game included Montana for the first time sixty years later in 1998;it began in 1984, between Eastern Washington and Idaho.

References

Montana
Montana Grizzlies football seasons
Montana Grizzlies football